There have been many colonial governors of Anguilla. The official title of the position began as Deputy Governor of Anguilla, which transitioned to Chief Magistrate of Anguilla, and then became the current title of Governor of Anguilla.

Deputy Governors

William Watts 1660-1666
Abraham Howell 1666-1689
George Leonard 1689-1735
John Richardson 1735-1741
Arthur Hodge 1741-1749
John Welch 1749-1750
Benjamin Gumbs II 1750-1768
Benjamin Roberts 1768-1771
John Smith 1771-1776
Benjamin Gumbs III 1776-1782
Thomas Hodge 1782-1805
William Richardson 1805-1829

Chief Magistrates

Richard Challenger 1842-1846
Isidor Dyett 1862-1863
George Alsbury 26 November 1863 - 28 January 1868
Alexander Augustus Melfort Campbell (1827–1890) January 1868 - February 1869
Neale Porter March 1869 - May 1871
D.S. Lloyd c. 1873
James L. Lake c. 1879-1882
Edwin Baynes 1888
N. Lockhart c. 1896
Joseph Numa Rat 1897 - c. 1904
G.B. Mason c. 1905
Alan Cuthbert Burns 1910-1912
W.E. Burton 1913
G.I. Mendes c. 1913-1915
W.E. Burton (second time) 1917-1918
S.B. Jones 9 August 1918 - 31 May 1923
J.Y. MacFadyen c. 1926-1933
C.E.E. Stevens c. 1937-1938
A.P. McDonald c. 1939-1948
J.D. Maloney (1905-?) c. 1952-1958
G.C.H. Thomas (1911-?) c. 1958-1962
Vincent F. Byron 1962 - 31 May 1967
Peter Adams July 1967 - 23 February 1968

Governors

Charles Harry Godden 1982–1983
Alastair Turner Baillie 1983–1987
Geoffrey Owen Whittaker 1987–1989
Brian G.J. Canty 1989–1992
Alan W. Shave 1992–1995
Alan Hoole 1995–1996
Robert Harris (born 1941) December 1996 – 27 January 2000
Roger Cousins (acting)   2000
Peter Johnstone (born 1944) 4 February 2000 – 29 April 2004
Mark Capes (acting)   2004
Alan Huckle   28 May 2004 – July 2006
Mark Capes (acting)   2006
Andrew George 10 July 2006 – 11 March 2009
Stanley Reid (acting) 11 March 2009 – 21 April 2009
Alistair Harrison 21 April 2009 – 18 July 2013
Christina Scott 23 July 2013 – 2017
Tim Foy 2017 – 2020
Dileeni Daniel-Selvaratnam 2021 to date

References

External links
 Government of Anguilla
 Governor George has left the island, new Governor expected in April

Government of Anguilla
Colonial
History of Anguilla
Anguilla